Rajnikant Somabhai Patel is a Member of Legislative assembly from Bechraji constituency and Minister of state for Home Affairs in Gujarat for its 12th legislative assembly.

References

Living people
Bharatiya Janata Party politicians from Gujarat
Gujarat MLAs 2012–2017
Gujarat MLAs 2007–2012
People from Mehsana district
Year of birth missing (living people)